The 2005 Spanish Grand Prix (formally the Formula 1 Gran Premio Marlboro de España 2005) was a Formula One motor race, held on 8 May 2005 at Circuit de Catalunya in Montmeló,  Spain.

Report

Background 
The BAR-Honda did not take part in this race, serving the first of a two race ban following irregularities at the San Marino Grand Prix.

Qualifying 
Kimi Räikkönen drove to the pole position before Mark Webber, who set the fastest lap during the second qualifying session to claim the front row, leaving championship leader Fernando Alonso on the second row in third.

Race 
Right from the start Räikkönen started pulling away at a blistering pace, setting the fastest lap thirteen times in only twenty four laps.  Alonso's tyres wore down and he was forced to take care of them and come home in second place, never taking the lead from Räikkönen.

Webber had a dismal start, losing second and then third to Alonso and Ralf Schumacher, respectively.  After the first round of pitstops he lost three positions and had to battle his way back to finish in sixth.  Alonso's teammate Giancarlo Fisichella moved around constantly in the field, but managed to end up in fifth from sixth on the grid.

Jarno Trulli had a good race, ending up on the podium in third ahead of his teammate Ralf Schumacher, who fell behind after the first round of pitstops.  Meanwhile, Räikkönen's teammate Juan Pablo Montoya had an average race, moving around in the field but still only managing a seventh place.  It was his return from a two-race absence to recover from a shoulder injury. David Coulthard claimed the final points-paying position in eighth after starting from ninth.

Some of the retirements included Michael Schumacher, whose tyre failed on lap 47, his third retirement of the year.  Jacques Villeneuve also had to retire on lap 52 after a water leak resulted in his engine overheating.

This was Räikkönen's first victory of 2005.

Friday drivers
The bottom 6 teams in the 2004 Constructors' Championship were entitled to run a third car in free practice on Friday. These drivers drove on Friday but did not compete in qualifying or the race.

Classification

Qualifying

Notes
  – Tiago Monteiro and Rubens Barrichello received a 10-place grid penalty for engine changes.
  – Nick Heidfeld received a 20-place grid penalty for engine changes.

Race

Championship standings after the race 

Drivers' Championship standings

Constructors' Championship standings

Note: Only the top five positions are included for both sets of standings.

See also 
 2005 Catalunya GP2 Series round

References

Spanish Grand Prix
Grand Prix
Spanish Grand Prix
May 2005 sports events in Europe